Alexander Dawes (20 November 1859 – 24 February 1939) was a New Zealand cricketer. He played two first-class matches for Otago between 1884 and 1895.

Dawes was born at Inverness in Scotland in 1859. Professionally he worked as a coach builder.

References

External links
 

1859 births
1939 deaths
New Zealand cricketers
Otago cricketers
Cricketers from Inverness
Scottish emigrants to New Zealand